This is the discography of American R&B singer Donell Jones.

Albums

Studio albums

Compilation albums

Singles

As lead artist

As featured artist

References

External links
 
 

Discographies of American artists
Rhythm and blues discographies
Soul music discographies